Furnas County is a county in the U.S. state of Nebraska. As of the 2020 United States Census, the population was 4,636. Its county seat is Beaver City. The county was named for Robert Wilkinson Furnas, the second governor of the state of Nebraska.

In the Nebraska license plate system, Furnas County is represented by the prefix 38 (it had the thirty-eighth-largest number of vehicles registered in the county when the license plate system was established in 1922).

Geography
Furnas County lies on the south line of Nebraska. The south boundary line of Furnas County abuts the north boundary line of the state of Kansas. The Republican River flows eastward across the upper central part of the county.

Major highways

  U.S. Highway 6
  U.S. Highway 34
  U.S. Highway 136
  U.S. Highway 283
  Nebraska Highway 46
  Nebraska Highway 47
  Nebraska Highway 89

Adjacent counties

 Harlan County – east
 Norton County, Kansas – south
 Decatur County, Kansas – southwest
 Red Willow County – west
 Frontier County – northwest
 Gosper County – north
 Phelps County – northeast

Demographics

As of the 2000 United States Census, there were 5,324 people, 2,278 households, and 1,489 families in the county. The population density was 7 people per square mile (3/km2). There were 2,730 housing units at an average density of 4 per square mile (1/km2). The racial makeup of the county was 98.22% White, 0.08% Black or African American, 0.41% Native American, 0.23% Asian, 0.32% from other races, and 0.75% from two or more races. 1.15% of the population were Hispanic or Latino of any race. 45.6% were of German, 13.8% American, 11.4% English, 7.4% Irish and 5.2% Swedish ancestry.

There were 2,278 households, out of which 28.00% had children under the age of 18 living with them, 57.20% were married couples living together, 5.90% had a female householder with no husband present, and 34.60% were non-families. 32.50% of all households were made up of individuals, and 19.80% had someone living alone who was 65 years of age or older. The average household size was 2.28 and the average family size was 2.88.

The county population contained 24.10% under the age of 18, 5.30% from 18 to 24, 22.80% from 25 to 44, 23.90% from 45 to 64, and 23.80% who were 65 years of age or older. The median age was 44 years. For every 100 females there were 92.30 males. For every 100 females age 18 and over, there were 88.00 males.

The median income for a household in the county was $30,498, and the median income for a family was $37,000. Males had a median income of $26,563 versus $19,918 for females. The per capita income for the county was $17,223. About 6.90% of families and 10.60% of the population were below the poverty line, including 14.50% of those under age 18 and 10.50% of those age 65 or over.

Communities

Cities 

 Arapahoe
 Beaver City (county seat)
 Cambridge

Villages 

 Edison
 Hendley
 Holbrook
 Oxford (partial)
 Wilsonville

Unincorporated communities 

 Hollinger
 Precept

Politics
Furnas County voters have been strongly Republican since its beginning. In only one national election since 1916 the county been carried by a Democratic Party presidential candidate.

See also
 National Register of Historic Places listings in Furnas County NE
 Medicine Creek (Republican River tributary)

References

External links

 
Nebraska counties
1873 establishments in Nebraska
Populated places established in 1873